Terrace Marshall Jr. (born June 9, 2000) is an American football wide receiver for the Carolina Panthers of the National Football League (NFL). He played college football at LSU, and was drafted by the Panthers in the second round of the 2021 NFL Draft.

Early years
Marshall attended Parkway High School in Bossier City, Louisiana. As a junior he had 55 receptions for 1,250 yards with 15 touchdowns and was named the Shreveport Times Male Athlete of the Year. He missed most of his senior season due to an ankle injury. Despite the injury he was still named a 2018 Under Armour All-American. A five star recruit, he committed to Louisiana State University (LSU) to play college football.

College career
As a true freshman at LSU in 2018, Marshall played in 13 games with one start and had 12 receptions for 192 yards. He returned to LSU in 2019 as one of LSU's top three receivers along with Justin Jefferson and Ja'Marr Chase.  Although he missed 3 games due to injury, he still managed to score 13 touchdowns, including 2 vs Georgia in the SEC Championship, 2 vs Oklahoma in the Sugar Bowl, and 1 vs Clemson in the College Football Championship game win. Against the Texas Longhorns, Marshall, Jefferson and Chase each had 100 receiving yards, the first time in school history three players had over 100 yards receiving.

On November 29, 2020, Marshall declared for the 2021 NFL Draft and opted out of the remainder of the 2020 college football season.  Up until that point, Marshall recorded 731 receiving yards and 10 receiving touchdowns (both third in the SEC) in seven games played.

Professional career

Marshall was selected by the Carolina Panthers in the second round (59th overall) of the 2021 NFL Draft. He signed his four-year rookie contract with Carolina on June 17, 2021, worth $5.7 million. As a rookie, he appeared in 13 games and recorded 17 receptions for 138 receiving yards. In Week 9 of the 2022 season, Marshall recorded his first professional touchdown on a 21-yard reception in the 42–21 loss to the Cincinnati Bengals. He finished the 2022 season with 28 receptions for 490 receiving yards and one receiving touchdown in 14 games.

Personal life
His uncle, Joe Delaney, played in the NFL and died in 1983 attempting to rescue three children from drowning in a pond, before Marshall was born.

References

External links
Carolina Panthers bio
LSU Tigers bio

2000 births
Living people
Players of American football from Louisiana
Sportspeople from Bossier City, Louisiana
American football wide receivers
LSU Tigers football players
Carolina Panthers players